Olaf Luiga (23 August 1908 – 5 July 1939) was an Estonian weightlifter. He competed in the men's light heavyweight event at the 1928 Summer Olympics.

Luiga began training as a boxer at the Kalev Tallinn multi-sport club in 1924 with Valter Palm. From 1933 to 1939 he was a member of the board of the Kalev Weightlifting Department. He was a member of both the Estonian national weightlifting and wrestling teams. He died of cancer, aged 30, and was buried in Tallinn's Rahumäe cemetery.

References

1908 births
1939 deaths
Estonian male weightlifters
Olympic weightlifters of Estonia
Weightlifters at the 1928 Summer Olympics
Sportspeople from Omsk
Burials at Rahumäe Cemetery
Deaths from cancer in Estonia